Praia Melão is a seaside village in the north-eastern part of São Tomé Island in São Tomé and Príncipe, part of Mé-Zóchi District. Its population is 2,668 (2012 census). It lies 1 km northeast of Almas, 1 km southeast of Pantufo and 4.5 km southeast of the capital São Tomé.

Population history

References

Populated places in Mé-Zóchi District
Populated coastal places in São Tomé and Príncipe